Nonstop or non-stop may refer to:

Computing
NonStop (server computers), a fault-tolerant computer architecture by Tandem Computers (later Compaq, now Hewlett-Packard)
NonStop SQL, relational database software by Tandem Computers (later Compaq, now Hewlett-Packard)
UnixWare NonStop Clusters, a fault tolerant computer system sold by SCO

Film and TV
Non-Stop (2013 film), starring Lacey Chabert
Non-Stop (film) (2014), starring Liam Neeson
Cozi TV, a network of digital subchannels on NBC's owned-and-operated television stations formerly known as NBC Nonstop
Nonstop (South Korean TV series), a South Korean sitcom, 2000-2006
Nonstop (Chinese TV series), the Chinese version of the South Korean sitcom, 2009
 Non-Stop (France), 6-hour-daily live news show on BFMTV

Music
Nonstop (band), a Portuguese girl band

Albums
Nonstop!, James Brown album
Nonstop (Vocal Point album)
NonStop (Fun Factory album)
Non Stop (Julio Iglesias album)
Non Stop (Reflex album)
Non-Stop (Andy Bell album)
Non-Stop (B. T. Express album)
Nonstop (EP), an EP by Oh My Girl, or the title song
XXV Nonstop, by Sick of It All

Songs
"Nonstop" (song), a song by Drake
"Non Stop", a song by Exo from the album Obsession
"Non-Stop", a song from the musical Hamilton
"Non-Stop", a song by the Human League from the 1981 single "Open Your Heart"
"Nonstop", an instrumental piano solo by Juan María Solare

Other uses
Non-Stop (novel), a 1958 science fiction novel by Brian Aldiss
24/7 service, a service available at all times
Non-stop decay, cellular mechanism to prevent translation of mRNA molecules lacking a stop codon
Non-stop flight, an airplane flight with no intermediate stops